On May 4, 2019, the city of Dallas, Texas, held an election to choose the next Mayor of Dallas. The election began as a nonpartisan blanket primary, no candidate took a majority of over 50% of the total vote so the two top vote-earners Eric Johnson and Scott Griggs advanced to a runoff election on June 8. Incumbent mayor Mike Rawlings was unable to run for reelection due to term limits. Dallas also concurrently elected all 14 members of its city council, and 3 of the 9 total members of the Dallas Independent School District. Johnson won the runoff with 55.61%.

Candidates
Thirteen candidates declared campaigns for Dallas Mayor ahead of the filing deadline. One dropped out voluntary, while three failed to qualify, which left nine candidates for the May ballot.

Qualified candidates 
Mike Ablon, real estate developer
Albert Black, chair of the Dallas Housing Authority
Scott Griggs, Dallas City Councilmember, District 1
Eric Johnson, member of the Texas House of Representatives
Alyson Kennedy, activist, Socialist Workers Party member, 2016 presidential candidate
Lynn McBee, philanthropist
Regina Montoya, attorney, former aide during the Presidency of Bill Clinton, and Democratic nominee for Texas's 5th congressional district in 2000
Miguel Solis, Dallas Independent School District Trustee, District 8
Jason Villalba, former member of the Texas House of Representatives

Did not qualify
Heriberto Ortiz
Miguel Patino, resident of Oak Cliff
Stephen S. Smith

Dropped out of race 
 Larry Casto, former Dallas City Attorney endorsed Mike Ablon

Endorsements

Results

References

Dallas mayoral
Dallas
2019
Non-partisan elections
2010s in Dallas